Leith Patricia Mullings (April 8, 1945 – December 13, 2020) was a Jamaican-born author, anthropologist and professor. She was president of the American Anthropological Association from 2011–2013, and was a Distinguished Professor of Anthropology at the Graduate Center of the City University of New York. Mullings was involved in organizing for progressive social justice, racial equality and economic justice as one of the founding members of the Black Radical Congress and in her role as President of the AAA.  Under her leadership, the American Anthropological Association took up the issue of academic labor rights.

Her research and writing focused on structures of inequality and resistance to them. Her research began in Africa and she wrote about traditional medicine and religion in postcolonial Ghana, as well as about women’s roles in Africa. In the U.S. her work centered on urban communities.  She was recognized for this work by the Society for the Anthropology of North America, which awarded her the Prize for Distinguished Achievement in the Critical Study of North America in 1997.  Mullings was working on an ethnohistory of the African Burial Ground in New York City at the time of her death.

Publications 
1984 Therapy, Ideology and Social Change: Mental Healing in Urban Ghana, Berkeley and Los Angeles: University of California Press.
1987 Cities of the United States: Studies in Urban Anthropology, editor, New York: Columbia University Press.
1997 On Our Own Terms: Race, Class and Gender in the Lives of African American Women, New York: Routledge.
2001 Stress and Resilience: The Social Context of Reproduction in Central Harlem, New York: Kluwer Academic/Plenum Publishers (with Alaka Wali).
2002 Freedom: A Photographic History of the African American Struggle, London: Phaidon Press. Awarded a Krazna-Krausz Foundation Book Prize (with Manning Marable).
2009 Let Nobody Turn Us Around: An Anthology of African American Social and Political Thought from Slavery to the Present, Second Edition, Lanham, MD: Rowman and Littlefield (co-edited with Manning Marable).

References

External links 
Leith Mulling's Official Website
 http://www.gc.cuny.edu/Page-Elements/Academics-Research-Centers-Initiatives/Doctoral-Programs/Anthropology/Faculty-Listing/Leith-Mullings
 AAA President
 Anthropology News
 SANA | Society for the Anthropology of North America
 The Sojourner Syndrome: Race, Class, and Gender in Health and Illness

1945 births
2020 deaths
City University of New York faculty
American women anthropologists
20th-century American anthropologists
20th-century American women writers
21st-century American anthropologists
21st-century American women writers
Queens College, City University of New York alumni
Cornell University alumni
University of Chicago alumni
People from Mandeville, Jamaica
American women academics